Stéphane Odet (born 26 November 1976) is a French former professional footballer who played as a midfielder.

References

1970 births
Living people
Association football midfielders
French footballers
FC Martigues players
SC Bastia players
AS Beauvais Oise players
Marignane Gignac Côte Bleue FC players
Ligue 1 players
Ligue 2 players